Iron Angel of the Apocalypse is a video game developed by Synergy, Inc. and published by Panasonic for the 3DO.

Gameplay 

Iron Angel of the Apocalypse is a first-person game set in a maze.

Synopsis 

In a tower rising high above a desolate city, a mad-genius scientist pursues his experiments. His mission: to create the ultimate killing machine and purge the world! The means of achieving his wild ambition will soon be set in motion. All that remains is the last piece of equipment for Tetsujin... and you (which is the player) have been chosen.

Development and release

Reception 

Next Generation reviewed the game, rating it three stars out of five, and stated that "Not better than the rest, just different." Next Generation also reviewed the US version of the game, rating it three stars out of five, and stated that "it goes a long way toward leaving the trippy dreaminess from the Japanese version intact, and in some ways, makes it creepier."

Sequel
There is a sequel to Iron Angel of the Apocalypse, entitled Iron Angel of the Apocalypse: The Return for the 3DO and Microsoft Windows.

Notes

References

External links
 Iron Angel of the Apocalypse at GameFAQs
 Iron Angel of the Apocalypse at Giant Bomb
 Iron Angel of the Apocalypse at MobyGames

1994 video games
3DO Interactive Multiplayer games
3DO Interactive Multiplayer-only games
First-person shooters
Sprite-based first-person shooters
Video games about mecha
Video games developed in Japan
Video games with 2.5D graphics